Koski Tl is a municipality of Finland.

It is located in the Southwest Finland region and was part of the former province of Western Finland.

Tl in the name means the former province of Turku and Pori. It was attached to the name to distinguish Koski Tl from another municipality named Koski, Koski Hl (Hl for the former province of Häme). Koski Hl was renamed Hämeenkoski in 1995 but Koski Tl has not changed its name.

Koski is unilingually Finnish.

Koski's neighbouring municipalities are Loimaa, Marttila, Pöytyä, Salo, Somero and Ypäjä.

Sights

Hämeen Härkätie runs through Koski and it crosses the Paimio River in the center of Koski. 
The church of Koski was designed by architect Toivo Paatela and it was completed in 1935. 
There is also an observation tower near the highest points of Hevonlinna ridge and Hevonlinnanjärvi.

Yrjö Liipola Art Museum is exhibiting Yrjö Liipola's art collection.

Gallery

References

External links

Municipality of Koski Tl – Official website 

Municipalities of Southwest Finland
Populated places established in 1869
1869 establishments in the Russian Empire